Black Snake is an unincorporated community located in Bell County, Kentucky, United States.

Black Snake has been noted for its unusual place name.

References

Unincorporated communities in Bell County, Kentucky
Unincorporated communities in Kentucky
Coal towns in Kentucky